The Penguin Pool Murder is a 1932 American pre-Code comedy/mystery film starring Edna May Oliver as Hildegarde Withers, a witness in a murder case at the New York Aquarium, with James Gleason as the police inspector in charge of the case, who investigates with her unwanted help, and Robert Armstrong as an attorney representing Mae Clarke, the wife of the victim. Oliver's appearance was the first film appearance of the character of Hildegarde Withers, the schoolteacher and sleuth based on the character from the 1931 novel The Penguin Pool Murder by Stuart Palmer.  It is the first in a trilogy including Murder on the Blackboard, and Murder on a Honeymoon, in which Oliver and Gleason team up for the lead roles.

Plot
Gwen Parker (Mae Clarke) meets her former boyfriend Philip Seymour (Donald Cook) at the local aquarium, and asks him for some money so she can leave her husband, stockbroker Gerald Parker (Guy Usher); but Mr. Parker receives an anonymous telephone call tipping him off to the rendezvous. When he confronts the pair, Seymour knocks him out with a punch. As no witnesses see the altercation, he hides the unconscious man in the room behind an exhibit.

Schoolteacher Hildegarde Withers (Edna May Oliver) takes her class on a field trip to the aquarium. She helps stop a pickpocket, "Chicago" Lew (Joe Hermano), by tripping him with her umbrella, but he slips away. Soon afterward, she loses her hatpin; one of her students finds it. Then she sees Parker's now-dead body falling into a pool housing a penguin. 

Police Inspector Oscar Piper (James Gleason) arrives and uncovers several suspects: the widow and Seymour; Bertrand Hemingway (Clarence Wilson), the head of the aquarium, who had financial dealings with the deceased; and Chicago Lew, found hiding near the scene. Lawyer Barry Costello (Robert Armstrong), a bystander, catches Gwen Parker when she faints, and acquires a client when she is taken in for questioning. He also becomes Seymour's lawyer.

Miss Withers makes herself useful to Piper by taking notes on his interviews and her observations, typing them up for him, calling attention to points he has missed, and making him a meal. He is appreciative enough to not object when she continues to insert herself into his investigation. However, she herself later becomes a suspect when it is determined that her hatpin was driven through the man's right ear into his brain.

Seymour confesses to protect Mrs. Parker, but Miss Withers does not believe him. She convinces Piper to notify the press that the murder was committed with a thrust through the left ear.

Later, Costello passes along a message from Chicago Lew, in which he claims to know the identity of the killer. When Piper and Miss Withers go to see him at the jail, though, they find him dead from hanging. Costello demonstrates a way in which Seymour could have escaped from his nearby cell using a duplicate key (which is found), strangled Lew, and hanged him with wire without entering Lew's cell.

At the murder trial of Philip Seymour and Gwen Parker, Costello questions Miss Withers, but slips up, showing that he knew that Gerald Parker was killed via the right ear. He phoned the tip to Seymour and killed him because he is Gwen's lover and wanted her to himself.

When Gwen Parker is released, the waiting Seymour slaps her in the face, to the amusement of Piper and Miss Withers. Piper then unexpectedly asks Miss Withers to marry him. She accepts. (In the sequel, Murder on the Blackboard, they are still single.)

Cast

Edna May Oliver as Miss Hildegarde Martha Withers 
Robert Armstrong as Barry Costello
James Gleason as Inspector Oscar Piper
Mae Clarke as Gwen Parker
Donald Cook as Philip Seymour
Edgar Kennedy as Policeman Donovan
Clarence Wilson as Bertrand B. Hemingway

James Donlan as Security Guard Fink
Gustav von Seyffertitz as Von Donnen/Dr Max Bloom
Joe Hermano as Chicago Lew
Guy Usher as Gerald Parker
Rochelle Hudson as Parker's Telephone Operator
Wilfrid North as The Judge

Cast notes
Oliver reprised her role in two sequels, Murder on the Blackboard (1934) and Murder on a Honeymoon (1935)
Gleason played the role of Piper in all six films in the series.

Reception
The film received mixed reviews in 1932. In his assessment of the production on December 27, Mordaunt Hall of The New York Times describes it as "a series of hilarious doings in which Miss Oliver has a jolly time." Hall, though, contends that the film's frequent "levity" fails to be counterbalanced by an engaging or even moderately challenging mystery:

References

External links
 
 
 
 

1932 films
1930s comedy mystery films
American comedy mystery films
American black-and-white films
Films based on American novels
Films directed by George Archainbaud
Films set in New York City
RKO Pictures films
Hildegarde Withers
1932 comedy films
1930s American films